Sellocharis paradoxa is a species of flowering plants in the family Fabaceae. It belongs to the subfamily Faboideae. It is native to Brazil and is the only member of the genus Sellocharis.

References

Genisteae
Monotypic Fabaceae genera